Waxahachie High School of Choice is an alternative high school for at-risk students in Waxahachie Independent School District, Texas. The campus includes a District Challenge Academy (where students are sent for bad behavior) as well as a day care center. The school is located at Turner Learning Center in Waxahachie, Texas. All students that attend WHSoC are automatically put on the Texas Minimum Graduation Plan. Students who qualify for WHSoC are students with grade problems, behavioral problems, or hardships.

References

External links 
 Waxahachie Challenge Academy
 Waxahachie High School of Choice

Educational institutions in the United States with year of establishment missing
Schools in Ellis County, Texas
Waxahachie, Texas
Public high schools in Texas